Antoine De Buck was a Belgian gymnast. He competed in the men's artistic individual all-around event at the 1908 Summer Olympics.

References

Year of birth missing
Year of death missing
Belgian male artistic gymnasts
Olympic gymnasts of Belgium
Gymnasts at the 1908 Summer Olympics
Place of birth missing